Deborah (Debbie) Scerri (born on 25 March 1969 in Toronto) is a Maltese television presenter and singer.

She represented Malta in the European Union, Malta and Cyprus Song Festival in 1994, held in Thessaloniki. She also represented Malta in the Eurovision Song Contest 1997 which was held in Dublin with the song "Let Me Fly". The song finished in 9th place with 66 points.

The song got the maximum 12 points from Turkey, 10 points from Norway, eight points from both Greece and Croatia, seven points from Ireland, six points from Italy, five points from Bosnia and Herzegovina and Cyprus, three points from Denmark, and 1 point each from Spain and France.

That year the only songs which were performed in English were the Maltese entry, the Irish entry and the winning British entry, "Love Shine a Light".

Her purple and blue dress made her be the first winner ever of the show's Barbara Dex Award for its most bizarre costume.

Debbie Scerri is married and has a child. She is still active in the music festivals scene. She works as a television presenter in Malta, hosting various shows. She has also taken part as an actress in some local television serials, and now forms part of the Animae Gospel Choir.

References 

20th-century Maltese women singers
20th-century Maltese singers
Eurovision Song Contest entrants for Malta
Eurovision Song Contest entrants of 1997
Living people
1969 births